The 2014–15 San Jose Sharks season was the 24th season in the National Hockey League. The Sharks did not qualify for the 2015 Stanley Cup playoffs, thus ending their ten-season playoff streak.

Off-season
On May 15, 2014, following a first round playoff loss to the Los Angeles Kings, General Manager Doug Wilson made known his intentions to build a "younger, more aggressive team", announcing that the team would retain Head Coach Todd McLellan, but will move 33-year-old winger Martin Havlat, who still had one year on remaining his contract, and would not re-sign 37-year-old impending unrestricted free agent defenceman Dan Boyle. The Sharks also acquired John Scott and Tye McGinn.

Regular season
The Sharks did not qualify for the Stanley Cup playoffs for the first time since 2002–03, ending the second-longest active NHL playoff appearance streak at ten seasons.

Standings

Schedule and results

Pre-season
The pre-season schedule was announced on June 19.

Regular season
The regular season schedule was announced on June 22.

Player statistics

Skaters
Final statistics.

Goaltenders

†Denotes player spent time with another team before joining the Sharks.  Stats reflect time with the Sharks only.
‡Traded mid-season
Bold/italics denotes franchise record

Notable occurrences

Milestones

Awards

Suspensions and fines

Transactions
The Sharks have been involved in the following transactions during the 2014–15 season:

Trades

Free agents acquired

Free agents lost

Claimed via waivers

Lost via waivers

Players released

Lost via retirement

Player signings

Draft picks

The 2014 NHL Entry Draft was held on June 27–28, 2014, at the Wells Fargo Center in Philadelphia.

Draft notes
The Chicago Blackhawks' first-round pick went to San Jose Sharks as the result of a trade on June 27, 2014, that sent a first-round pick in 2014 (27th overall) and the Rangers sixth-round pick in 2014 (179th overall) to Chicago in exchange for a first-round pick in 2014 (20th overall) and this pick.
The Pittsburgh Penguins' second-round pick went to the San Jose Sharks as the result of a trade on March 25, 2013, that sent Douglas Murray to the Penguins in exchange for a 2013 second-round pick (#58–Tyler Bertuzzi) and this conditional pick.
Condition – Second-round pick if Penguins advance to third round of 2013 playoffs or if Murray re-signs with Penguins for 2013–14 season, else third-round pick. Converted to third-round pick when Penguins were eliminated in second-round of 2013 playoffs and Murray signed with the Montreal Canadiens on August 22, 2013.
The San Jose Sharks' fourth-round pick went to the Edmonton Oilers as the result of a trade on October 21, 2013, that sent Mike Brown to the Sharks in exchange for this pick.
The New York Rangers' fifth-round pick went to the San Jose Sharks as the result of a trade on April 2, 2013, that sent Ryan Clowe to the Rangers in exchange for a 2013 second-round pick (#49–Gabryel Paquin-Boudreau), a 2013 third-round pick (#62–Yan-Pavel Laplante) and this conditional pick.
Condition – Second round if Rangers advance to third round of 2013 playoffs or if Clowe re-signs with Rangers after 2013 season, else fifth round. Converted on July 5, 2013.
The San Jose Sharks' fifth-round pick went to the Chicago Blackhawks as the result of a trade on June 30, 2013, that sent Anaheim's fourth-round pick in 2013, and a fifth-round pick in 2013 to the Sharks in exchange for a fourth-round pick in 2013 and this pick.
The San Jose Sharks' seventh-round pick went to the Detroit Red Wings as the result of a trade on June 10, 2012, that sent Brad Stuart to the Sharks in exchange for Andrew Murray, and this conditional pick.
Condition – If Stuart re-signs with Sharks. Converted on June 18, 2012.

References

External links
Official website

San Jose Sharks seasons
San Jose
San Jose
San Jose Sharks
San Jose Sharks